Temel Karamollaoğlu (born 20 September 1941) is a Turkish engineer and politician who is currently the leader of the Felicity Party (SP) since 2016. A prominent Islamist, Karamollaoğlu was the Mayor of Sivas from 1989 to 1995 and served twice as a Member of Parliament for Sivas from 1977 to 1980 and from 1996 to 2002.

Early life and career 
Temel Karamollaoğlu, originally from Gürün, a district of Sivas, was born on June 7 1941 in Kahramanmaraş as one of the seven children of Üzeyir and Münire Karamollaoğlu couple. After completing his primary and secondary education in various provinces due to his father's duty as a teacher, he graduated from University of Manchester Institute of Science and Technology textile technology department in 1964, where he went on a scholarship in the 1960s. He completed his master's degree at the same university in 1967. In the same year he returned to Turkey and began working as a project engineer. In 1967, he worked as a specialist in the State Planning Organization. Between 1967 and 1972, he worked as a textile sector specialist at DPT. Karamollaoğlu, who worked in the private sector for two years after his military service, served as the Incentive and Implementation General Manager of the Ministry of Industry and Technology in 1975. Karamollaoğlu, who speaks fluent English, has been married since 1965 and has 5 children.

Political life 

In 1977, he was elected as a deputy of Sivas from the National Salvation Party and he was, one year later, elected as a member of the party general assembly in 1978.

After the 1980 Turkish coup d'état, he remained out of active politics until the 1987 Turkish constitutional referendum. In the 1980s, he worked as a private consultant for a while and then held administrative positions in a textile company.

He entered the parliament after the 1995 Turkish general election as a deputy of Sivas of the Welfare Party. During this period, he served as a member of the NATO Parliamentary Assembly. At the same time, he was elected as the Welfare Party group vice president. He continued this duty until the Welfare Party was shut down.

Later, he joined the Virtue Party after the Welfare Party was dissolved by the Constitutional Court. He was re-elected as a deputy of Sivas in the 1999 Turkish general election. At the Felicity Party (SP) congress held in May 2000, he was elected as a member of the general administrative board and was appointed as the vice president responsible for foreign affairs. 

Karamollaoğlu was appointed as leader of the Felicity Party in 2016.

References 

Felicity Party politicians
Living people
People from Sivas
People from Kahramanmaraş
Turkish Islamists
Deputies of Sivas
Mayors of places in Turkey
Members of the 20th Parliament of Turkey
1941 births
Alumni of the University of Manchester Institute of Science and Technology
Virtue Party politicians
Welfare Party politicians
National Salvation Party politicians